Omokgyo Station is a station in the west of Seoul on Seoul Subway Line 5. It is considered the principal station of the affluent Mok-dong area, and the Hyperion Towers are right outside Exit 2. Mokdong Baseball Stadium, former home of the Korea Baseball Organization's Nexen Heroes, is a short walk from Exit 4. Broadcasting company SBS' headquarters is located nearby. It is one of two stations close to the Seoul Immigration Office, which is located near Exit 7.

Station layout

Exits
Exit number 1 is named after Daehakhakwon,a prep hagwon that is designed to prepare Jaesusaengs for the College Scholastic Ability Test known as "Suneung". Exit number 2 is connected to the mokdong branch of Hyundai Department Store. Exit number 3 is connected to the Mokdong Stadium. Exit number 4 is connected to the Dongsin University Oriental center,a traditional korean medicine hospital. Exit number 5 is connected to the mokdong branch of Hyundai Department Store.

References

External links
Seoul MRT's information on Omokgyo Station

Railway stations opened in 1996
Seoul Metropolitan Subway stations
Metro stations in Yangcheon District